Jason Michael Windsor (born 7 August 1972) is an English businessman and former first-class cricketer.

Windsor was born at Chesterfield in August 1972. He was educated at Repton School, before going up to Worcester College, Oxford. While studying at Oxford, he made two appearances in first-class cricket for Oxford University in 1995 against Derbyshire and Middlesex. He scored 28 runs in his two matches, with a high score of 14, while with his right-arm fast-medium bowling, he took 3 wickets. Windsor is currently the chief financial officer of Aviva, having been employed by the company since 2010.

References

External links

1972 births
Living people
People from Chesterfield, Derbyshire
People educated at Repton School
Alumni of Worcester College, Oxford
English cricketers
Oxford University cricketers
Chief financial officers
Aviva people